Milena Dimova (born 17 July 1994) is a Bulgarian female volleyball player, playing as aн opposite. She is part of the Bulgaria women's national volleyball team. 
She competed at the 2015 FIVB Volleyball Women's U23 World Championship, and at the 2015 FIVB World Grand Prix.

References

External links 
 Player info FIVB
 Player info, CEV

1994 births
Living people
Bulgarian women's volleyball players
Middle blockers